The Vanuatu national junior handball team is the national junior men's handball team of Vanuatu.

Oceania Handball Challenge Trophy record

External links
 Profile on International Handball Federation webpage
 Oceania Continent Handball Federation webpage

Men's national junior handball teams